Fighting Mad is a 1917 American silent Western film directed by Edward LeSaint and starring William Stowell, Helen Gibson and Hector Dion.

Cast
 William Stowell as Doctor Lambert
 Helen Gibson as Mary Lambert
 Hector Dion as Clean-Up West
 Betty Schade as Faro Fanny
 Alfred Allen as Eldorado Smith
 Mildred Davis as Lily Sawyer
 Millard K. Wilson as Frank Baxter

References

External links
 

1917 films
1917 Western (genre) films
1910s English-language films
American black-and-white films
Universal Pictures films
Films directed by Edward LeSaint
Silent American Western (genre) films
1910s American films